Cosmina Anișoara Dușa (born 4 March 1990) is a Romanian footballer who plays as a forward for Beroe in Bulgaria and the Romanian national team. As a player she won the national championship, the national cup and was top scorer of the league.

Career

Club 

Dușa started playing football in primary school with her brother's friends. At the age of 17, she was accepted by the Romanian women's football club champions, CFF Clujana Cluj. She made her official debut in a 2007–08 UEFA Women's Cup match against Umeå IK; scoring five goals in the three group matches. She later played for AS Volos 2004 from Greece and was called up for the Romania national team. In 2010, she returned to Cluj-Napoca and followed her first trainer, Mirel Albon, to the newly founded team CFF Olimpia Cluj. In the club's very first season Dușa scored 103 goals in the club's 24 matches, making her the Liga I top scorer. She repeated that feat by winning the 2012 top-scorer award with 71 goals. In the 2011–12 UEFA Women's Champions League qualifying she scored five goals in three matches.

She was awarded for "Best Women's Footballer" in Romania from 2010 to 2012.

By the end of September 2012, she transferred to the İzmir-based club Konak Belediyespor in Turkey.

International 
Dușa made her debut in the Romanian national team in March 2009 against Belgium. She featured for Romania in the 2011 FIFA Women's World Cup qualification tournament.

Career statistics
.

Honours

Club
 Romania Liga I Feminin
 CFF Clujana
 Winners (2): 2007–08, 2008–09

 CFF Olimpia Cluj
 Winners (2): 2011, 2012

 Romanian Women's Cupp
 CFF Clujana
 Winners (1): 2007–08

 CFF Olimpia Cluj
 Winners (2): 2011, 2012

 Turkish Women's First League
 Konak Belediyespor
 Winners (5): 2012–13, 2013–14, 2014–15, 2015–16, 2016–17
 Third place (1): 2017–18

Individual
 Turkish Women's First League
 Konak Belediyespor
 Top scorer (3): 2012–13, 2013–14, 2014–15

References

External links 
 Profile at uefa.com  

Living people
1990 births
People from Mureș County
Romanian women's footballers
Women's association football forwards
Konak Belediyespor players
FCU Olimpia Cluj players
CFF Clujana players
Turkish Women's Football Super League players
Romania women's international footballers
Romanian expatriate footballers
Romanian expatriate sportspeople in Turkey
Expatriate women's footballers in Turkey